Caenlochan is a glen in the Grampian Mountains of Scotland. Under EU Natura 2000 legislation it is a Special Area of Conservation for botanical reasons, containing plant communities found nowhere else in the UK. It is also a Special Protection Area for birds including the dotterel.

Deer densities in the Caenlochan area are among the highest in Scotland and deer herds of over 1000 animals are seen throughout the year.

The area was formerly a national nature reserve, however since 2005 this designation has applied only to Corrie Fee.

References

External links

Glens of Scotland
Special Areas of Conservation in Scotland
Environment of Angus, Scotland
Landforms of Angus, Scotland
Sites of Special Scientific Interest in Angus and Dundee